Lohan (Halau)is a village in  Nerwa is a tehsil in Shimla District of Himachal Pradesh, India. It is situated by a small river known by the name Shalvi. It is surrounded by a large number of small villages. Therefore, it acts as a center for all near villages in terms of education and market.

References

Shimla district